Soccer is a minor sport in the island country of Nauru. The country is not a member of FIFA.

History
The most popular code of football in Nauru has long been Australian rules football which was introduced during the early 20th century by Australians working in the phosphate industry. Soccer had been introduced as early as the 1890s but was overwhelmed by the organisation of Australian rules.

In 1954, local rugby and soccer leagues were all wound up as the popularity of Australian rules football on the island skyrocketed.

Soccer was re-introduced in the 1960s, by migrant workers from Kiribati, Solomon Islands, and Tuvalu. It enjoyed a period of relative popularity, and at one point the island had a six-team league. The all-time top scorer for the Tuvalu national football team, Alopua Petoa, is from Nauru.

A 2009 World Soccer article noted that organised soccer had "fallen apart" on Nauru, and that the island's was unlikely to ever field a team at the Pacific Games (the main regional tournament for non-FIFA teams).

In the 2019-2020 budget report by the Government of Nauru it was noted that all available open spaces on the island are used for Australian Rules Football, making it difficult to promote other sports such as soccer and softball.

Representative teams
The Nauru Soccer Federation has unsuccessfully applied for membership in the Oceania Football Confederation and FIFA in the past. The Rec.Sport.Soccer Statistics Foundation (RSSSF) suggests that it is "quite likely that there has been no official Nauru national soccer team." However, unofficial representative teams have been organised on at least two occasions. On 2 October 1994, a combined Nauru team played a team of expatriate workers from Solomon Islands in Denigomodu, winning 2–1. Another Nauruan select team was raised in 2014, playing a team from the Nauru Regional Processing Centre to celebrate World Refugee Day. In 2020, Nauru Soccer Federation vice-president Kaz Cain announced that Nauru was considering creating its first-ever official national side for a 2021 tournament in Hawaii.

Nauru Soccer League hoax
In 2020, a website for the new Nauru Soccer League appeared online. However, no such league existed and individuals involved with the sport on the island clarified that it was a hoax.

Nauru football venue

See also
 Nauru Soccer Federation
Australian rules football in Nauru

References